Kuru was a Vedic Indo-Aryan tribal union in northern Iron Age India, encompassing parts of the modern-day states of Haryana, Delhi, and some parts of western Uttar Pradesh, which appeared in the Middle Vedic period (c. 1200 – c. 900 BCE). The Kuru Kingdom was the first recorded state-level society in the Indian subcontinent.

The Kuru kingdom decisively changed the religious heritage of the early Vedic period, arranging their ritual hymns into collections called the Vedas, and developing new rituals which gained their position over Indian civilization as the Srauta rituals, which contributed to the so-called "classical synthesis" or "Hindu synthesis". It became the dominant political and cultural center of the middle Vedic Period during the reigns of Parikshit and Janamejaya, but declined in importance during the late Vedic period (c. 900 – c. 500 BCE) and had become "something of a backwater" by the Mahajanapada period in the 5th century BCE. However, traditions and legends about the Kurus continued into the post-Vedic period, providing the basis for the Mahabharata epic.

The main contemporary sources for understanding the Kuru kingdom are the Vedas, containing details of life during this period and allusions to historical persons and events. The time-frame and geographical extent of the Kuru kingdom (as determined by philological study of the Vedic literature) suggest its correspondence with the archaeological Painted Grey Ware culture.

Location
The Kuru state was located in central South Asia, stretching from the Gaṅgā river and the border of the Pañcāla state in the east to the Sarasvatī and the frontier of Rohītaka in the west, and bordered the Kulindas in the north and the Sūrasenas and Matsya in the south. The area formerly occupied by the Kuru kingdom covered the presently Thanesar, Delhi, and most of the upper Gangetic Doab.

The Kuru state was itself divided into the Kuru-jaṅgala​ ("Kuru forest"), the Kuru territory proper, and the Kuru-kṣetra​ ("Kuru field"):
Kuru-jaṅgala​ was a wild area which stretched from the Kāmyaka forest on the banks of the Sarasvatī to the Khāṇḍava​ forest
proper Kuru territory consisted of the region around Hāstīnapura
Kuru-kṣetra​ was located between the Khāṇḍava​ forest in the south, Tūrghna in the north, and Parīnaḥ in the west. Kuru-kṣetra​ was between the Sarasvatī and the Dṛṣadvatī rivers

The rivers flowing within the Kuru state included the Aruṇā, Aṃśumatī, Hiraṇvatī, Āpayā, Kauśikī, Sarasvatī, and Dṛṣadvatī or Rakṣī.

History

The Kuru clan was formed in the Middle Vedic period (c. 1200 – c. 900 BCE) as a result of the alliance and merger between the Bharata and other Puru clans, in the aftermath of the Battle of the Ten Kings. With their center of power in the Kurukshetra region, the Kurus formed the first political center of the Vedic period, and were dominant roughly from 1200 to 800 BCE. The first Kuru capital was at Āsandīvat, identified with modern Assandh in Haryana. Later literature refers to Indraprastha (identified with modern Delhi) and Hastinapura as the main Kuru cities.

The Kurus figure prominently in Vedic literature after the time of the Rigveda. The Kurus here appear as a branch of the early Indo-Aryans, ruling the Ganga-Yamuna Doab and modern Haryana. 
The focus in the later Vedic period shifted out of Punjab, into the Haryana and the Doab, and thus to the Kuru clan.

This trend corresponds to the increasing number and size of Painted Grey Ware (PGW) settlements in the Haryana and Doab area. Archaeological surveys of the Kurukshetra District have a revealed a more complex (albeit not yet fully urbanized) three-tiered hierarchy for the period of period from 1000 to 600 BCE, suggesting a complex chiefdom or emerging early state, contrasting with the two-tiered settlement pattern (with some "modest central places", suggesting the existence of simple chiefdoms) in the rest of the Ganges Valley. Although most PGW sites were small farming villages, several PGW sites emerged as relatively large settlements that can be characterized as towns; the largest of these were fortified by ditches or moats and embankments made of piled earth with wooden palisades, albeit smaller and simpler than the elaborate fortifications which emerged in large cities after 600 BCE.

The Atharvaveda (XX.127) praises Parikshit, the "King of the Kurus", as the great ruler of a thriving, prosperous realm. Other late Vedic texts, such as the Shatapatha Brahmana, commemorate Parikshit's son Janamejaya as a great conqueror who performed the ashvamedha (horse-sacrifice). These two Kuru kings played a decisive role in the consolidation of the Kuru state and the development of the srauta rituals, and they also appear as important figures in later legends and traditions (e.g., in the Mahabharata).

The Kurus declined after being defeated by the non-Vedic Salva (or Salvi) tribe, and the center of Vedic culture shifted east, into the Panchala realm, in Uttar Pradesh (whose king Keśin Dālbhya was the nephew of the late Kuru king). According to post-Vedic Sanskrit literature, the capital of the Kurus was later transferred to Kaushambi, in the lower Doab, after Hastinapur was destroyed by floods as well as because of upheavals in the Kuru family itself. In the post Vedic period (by the 6th century BCE), the Kuru dynasty evolved into Kuru and Vatsa janapadas, ruling over Upper Doab/Delhi/Haryana and lower Doab, respectively. The Vatsa branch of the Kuru dynasty further divided into branches at Kaushambi and at Mathura.

After the main Kuru ruling dynasty had moved to Kosambi, the Kuru country itself became divided into multiple small principalities, with the ones at Indapatta and one at Iṣukāra being the most prominent ones. By the time of the Buddha, these small statelets had been replaced by a Kuru  (republican state).

Society

The tribes that consolidated into the Kuru Kingdom or 'Kuru Pradesh' were largely semi-nomadic, pastoral tribes. However, as settlement shifted into the western Ganges Plain, settled farming of rice and barley became more important. Vedic literature of this time period indicates the growth of surplus production and the emergence of specialized artisans and craftsmen. Iron was first mentioned as śyāma āyasa (श्याम आयस, literally "black metal") in the Atharvaveda, a text of this era. Another important development was the fourfold varna (class) system, which replaced the twofold system of arya and dasa from the Rigvedic times. The Brahmin priesthood and Kshatriya aristocracy, who dominated the arya commoners (now called vaishyas) and the dasa labourers (now called shudras), were designated as separate classes.

Kuru kings ruled with the assistance of a rudimentary administration, including purohita (priest), village headman, army chief, food distributor, emissary, herald and spies. They extracted mandatory tribute (bali) from their population of commoners as well as from weaker neighboring tribes. They led frequent raids and conquests against their neighbors, especially to the east and south. To aid in governing, the kings and their Brahmin priests arranged Vedic hymns into collections and developed a new set of rituals (the now orthodox Srauta rituals) to uphold social order and strengthen the class hierarchy. High-ranking nobles could perform very elaborate sacrifices, and many poojas (rituals) primarily exalted the status of the king over his people. The ashvamedha or horse sacrifice was a way for a powerful king to assert his domination in northern India.

In epic literature

The epic poem, the Mahabharata, tells of a conflict between two branches of the reigning Kuru clan possibly around 1000 BCE. However, archaeology has not furnished conclusive proof as to whether the specific events described have any historical basis. The existing text of the Mahabharata went through many layers of development and mostly belongs to the period between c. 400 BCE and 400 CE. Within the frame story of the Mahabharata, the historical kings Parikshit and Janamejaya are featured significantly as scions of the Kuru clan.

A historical Kuru King named Dhritarashtra Vaichitravirya is mentioned in the Kathaka Samhita of the Yajurveda ( 1200–900 BCE) as a descendant of the Rigvedic-era king Sudas. His cattle were reportedly destroyed as a result of conflict with the vratya ascetics; however, this Vedic mention does not provide corroboration for the accuracy of the Mahabharata's account of his reign.

Kuru family tree in Mahabharata

See also
 Kuru related
 King Kuru
 Uttara Kurus, Uttara Kuru Kingdom
 Kuruvansh Ror Vansh

 Other Mahabharta related
 Parikshit, Janamejaya
 Panchala, Videha, Magadha, Nishada
Historicity of the Mahabharata

 Modern archaeology of Vedic era
 Cemetery H culture
 Painted Grey Ware culture
 Kingdoms of Ancient India

 Present day regions
 Regions of Haryana
 Regions of Rajasthan
 Regions of Uttar Pradesh

Notes

References

Sources

External links

Kuru Kingdom
Mahabharata of Krishna Dwaipayana Vyasa, translated to English by Kisari Mohan Ganguli
The Kuru race in Sri Lanka -  Web site of Kshatriya Maha Sabha
Coins of Kuru janapada

Kingdoms of the Puru clan
Iron Age countries in Asia
Iron Age cultures of South Asia
Ancient peoples
Indo-Aryan peoples
Mahabharata
Rigvedic tribes
Mahajanapadas
Locations in Hindu mythology
Regions of Haryana
Regions of Rajasthan
Regions of Uttar Pradesh
Regions of Punjab, India
Former kingdoms